Sierra Village is a census-designated place (CDP) in Tuolumne County, California. It is located roughly 1½ miles northeast of Mi-Wuk Village on State Route 108. The 2010 United States census reported Sierra Village's population was 456.

Geography
According to the United States Census Bureau, the CDP covers an area of 2.5 square miles (6.5 km2), 99.85% of it land and 0.15% of it water.

Demographics
The 2010 United States Census reported that Sierra Village had a population of 456. The racial makeup of Sierra Village was 421 (92.3%) White, 3 (0.7%) African American, 7 (1.5%) Native American, 3 (0.7%) Asian, 1 (0.2%) Pacific Islander, 7 (1.5%) from other races, and 14 (3.1%) from two or more races. Hispanic or Latino of any race were 36 persons (7.9%).

The Census reported that 456 people (100% of the population) lived in households, 0 (0%) lived in non-institutionalized group quarters, and 0 (0%) were institutionalized.

There were 221 households, out of which 41 (18.6%) had children under the age of 18 living in them, 114 (51.6%) were opposite-sex married couples living together, 10 (4.5%) had a female householder with no husband present, 9 (4.1%) had a male householder with no wife present.  There were 13 (5.9%) unmarried opposite-sex partnerships, and 1 (0.5%) same-sex married couples or partnerships. 68 households (30.8%) were made up of individuals, and 23 (10.4%) had someone living alone who was 65 years of age or older. The average household size was 2.06.  There were 133 families (60.2% of all households); the average family size was 2.53.

The population was spread out, with 65 people (14.3%) under the age of 18, 30 people (6.6%) aged 18 to 24, 78 people (17.1%) aged 25 to 44, 175 people (38.4%) aged 45 to 64, and 108 people (23.7%) who were 65 years of age or older.  The median age was 53.4 years. For every 100 females, there were 113.1 males.  For every 100 females age 18 and over, there were 109.1 males.

The homeowner vacancy rate was 4.9%; the rental vacancy rate was 11.8%.  315 people (69.1% of the population) lived in owner-occupied housing units and 141 people (30.9%) lived in rental housing units.

References

External links
 Mi Wuk Village Weather Station

Census-designated places in Tuolumne County, California
Populated places in the Sierra Nevada (United States)